1986 Just For Kicks was a various artists "hits" collection album released in Australia in 1986 on the Festival/EMI record Label (Cat No. HPP-261108). The album spent 4 weeks at the top of the Australian album charts in 1986.

Track listing

Charts

References

1986 compilation albums
EMI Records compilation albums
Pop compilation albums
Festival Records compilation albums